Adrián Chávez Ruiz (born 27 August 1976) is a Mexican politician affiliated with the Party of the Democratic Revolution. As of 2014 he served as Deputy of the LIX Legislature of the Mexican Congress as a plurinominal representative.

References

1976 births
Living people
Politicians from Mexico City
Members of the Chamber of Deputies (Mexico)
Party of the Democratic Revolution politicians
Autonomous University of Baja California Sur alumni
21st-century Mexican politicians
Deputies of the LIX Legislature of Mexico